Empress Feng may refer to several empresses in Chinese history:

Empress Dowager Feng (442-490), empress dowager and de facto ruler of Northern Wei, wife of Emperor Wencheng
Empress Feng Qing, empress of Northern Wei, first empress of Emperor Xiaowen
Empress Feng Run (died 499), empress of Northern Wei, second empress of Emperor Xiaowen
Empress Feng (Later Jin), empress of Later Jin

Feng